The Mauritian wood pigeon (Columba thiriouxi) is an extinct species of the pigeon genus Columba which was endemic to Mauritius. The holotype is a right tarsometatarsus collected in 1910 by Etienne Thirioux.

References 

Birds of Mauritius
Endemic fauna of Mauritius
Extinct birds of Indian Ocean islands
Columba (genus)
Birds described in 2011
Extinct animals of Mauritius